Mzamo Majola (born 20 February 1995 in Durban, South Africa) is a South African rugby union player for the  in Super Rugby and in the Currie Cup and the  in the Rugby Challenge. His regular position is prop.

Career

He represented the Sharks at the premier South African high school rugby competition, the Under-18 Craven Week held in Polokwane in July 2013, making three appearances.

Despite being included in the  squad for the 2015 Varsity Shield, he made no appearances for them.

He was named in a 37-man training squad for the South Africa national under-20 rugby union team and featured for them in a friendly match against a Varsity Cup Dream Team in April 2015. He was also included in the squad that embarked on a two-match tour of Argentina. He came on as a replacement in their 25–22 victory over Argentina and started their 39–28 victory a few days later.

Upon the team's return, he was named in the final squad for the 2015 World Rugby Under 20 Championship. He didn't feature in the first of their three matches in Pool B of the competition, a 33–5 win against hosts Italy, but came on as a replacement in their 40–8 win against Samoa and in their 46–13 win over Australia to help South Africa finish top of Pool B to qualify for the semi-finals with the best record pool stage of all the teams in the competition. Majola also played off the bench in their semi-final match against England, but could not prevent them losing 20–28 to be eliminated from the competition by England for the second year in succession as well as in their third-place play-off match against France, helping South Africa to a 31–18 win to secure third place in the competition.

References

South African rugby union players
Living people
1995 births
Rugby union players from Durban
Rugby union props
Sharks (Currie Cup) players
South Africa Under-20 international rugby union players
Southern Kings players
Sharks (rugby union) players
Seattle Seawolves players
Cheetahs (rugby union) players